Bakare is a Nigerian surname. Notable people with this name include:

 Airat Bakare
 Ariyon Bakare
 Afolabi Bakare
 Ayo Bakare
 Ayinde Bakare
 Bibi Bakare-Yusuf
 Tunde Bakare
 Karen Bakare
 Michael Bakare
 Musa Bakare
 Sebastian Bakare
 Dami Bakare
 Peter Bakare
 Olumide Bakare
 Dele Bakare
 S.B. Bakare
 Rasak Ojo Bakare

 Given name
 Bakare Kone
 Bakare Gbadamosi

See also 
 Bakari (name)
 Bakary

Surnames of Nigerian origin